Kwort is a Linux distribution, based on CRUX. Kwort's desktop environment is Openbox.

Installation 
The distribution is available for download as installation-only CD image suitable for x64-based computers. It does not provide installation program. Instead, text-based applications and scripts are used to install and configure the system. Contrary to CRUX Linux, the user doesn't need to compile a new kernel.

System requirements 
The system requirements of Kwort are:
 x86-64 processor.
 512 MB of RAM.
 1.4 GB free disk space.

Package manager 
Kwort Linux uses the kpkg package manager. kpkg can download and install packages from Kwort's or third party repositories and their mirrors.

Reception 
Tux Machines reviewed Kwort Linux in March 2006. The review included the following:

Jesse Smith wrote a review of Kwort 4.3 for DistroWatch Weekly:

See also 
 CRUX
 Openbox

External links

References 

X86-64 Linux distributions
Linux distributions without systemd
Linux distributions